Hikmet Çetin (born 1937) is a Turkish politician of Kurdish origin former minister of foreign affairs and was leader of the Republican People's Party (CHP) for a short time. He served also as the Speaker of the Turkish Grand National Assembly.

Early life
He was born in Lice, a town in the southeastern Diyarbakır Province. After completing primary school in his hometown and high school in Ankara, he graduated in 1960 with a B.A. degree in Economics and Finance from Ankara University, School of Political Sciences.

After completing his education, Hikmet Çetin joined the State Planning Organization (Turkish: Devlet Planlama Teşkilatı, DPT). Shortly after, he was sent abroad and also to the United States, where he received his M.A. in "Economics of development" from Williams College in Williamstown, Massachusetts, USA. In 1968, he did research work on "Planning models" at the Stanford University, California, USA. After returning home, he completed his military service in 1970 and worked as the head of Economics Planning Department at the DPT until 1977. During this time, he was a part-time lecturer at the Middle East Technical University in Ankara.

Political career
Hikmet Çetin stepped into politics in the 1977 general elections as deputy of Istanbul from the Republican People's Party (CHP). Between 1978 and 1979, he served as Minister of State and later as Deputy Prime Minister in the cabinet of the Prime Minister Bülent Ecevit. Following the 1980 military coup that banned the existing political parties, Hikmet Çetin became an advisor in planning to the Government of Yemen.

He returned to politics following his election to the parliament in 1987 as deputy of Diyarbakır from the Social Democratic Populist Party (Turkish: Sosyal Demokrat Halkçı Parti, SHP), the successor of the banned Republican People's Party. He served in the board of SHP and became its Secretary General. Hikmet Çetin was elected in 1991 for the third time to Parliament as deputy of Gaziantep from SHP.

He was appointed in 1991 Minister of Foreign Affairs in the coalition cabinet of Prime Minister Süleyman Demirel. He kept his seat in the coalition cabinet of Tansu Çiller, who took over the government leadership from Demirel after his rise to the Presidency. Hikmet Çetin resigned from his post on July 27, 1994.

In 1995, the two left wing parties, SHP and CHP decided to merge, and their general assemblies agreed on the leadership of Hikmet Çetin. He was elected chairman on February 18, 1995. At the party convention held on September 9, 1995, he did not run for the chair of the Republican People's Party again and resigned.

Hikmet Çetin retook his seat in the Parliament in the 1995 general elections and was elected as the Speaker of the Parliament on October 16, 1997 and occupied this position until April 18, 1999.

Diplomatic duty
He was appointed on November 19, 2003 as NATO Secretary General's first Senior Civilian Representative in Afghanistan, the highest-level political representative of NATO in this country, where it has held the command of the International Security Assistance Force (ISAF) since August 11, 2003. On January 26, 2004, he took office in Kabul, and served two consecutive terms until August 24, 2006.

After Politics

Since 2013, Çetin has been a Member of the Global Leadership Foundation (chaired by FW de Klerk), an organisation that works to support democratic leadership, prevent and resolve conflict through mediation and promote good governance in the form of democratic institutions, open markets, human rights and the rule of law. It does so by making available, discreetly and in confidence, the experience of former leaders to today’s national leaders. It is a not-for-profit organisation composed of former heads of government, senior governmental and international organization officials who work closely with heads of government on governance-related issues of concern to them.

Personal life 
Hikmet Çetin is of Kurdish descent, and is married to İnci Çetin, and they have two children.

See also
List of Turkish diplomats

References 
 Who is who  
 Prime Ministry of Turkey 
 Who is who at NATO?

External links

 Photos of Çetin's departure in Kabul

1937 births
Living people
People from Lice, Turkey
Contemporary Republican People's Party (Turkey) politicians
Ankara University Faculty of Political Sciences alumni
Williams College alumni
Turkish civil servants
Government ministers of Turkey
Ministers of Foreign Affairs of Turkey
Deputy Prime Ministers of Turkey
Leaders of the Republican People's Party (Turkey)
21st-century Turkish diplomats
Speakers of the Parliament of Turkey
International Security Assistance Force
Stanford University alumni
20th-century Turkish economists
Deputies of Istanbul
Deputies of Diyarbakır
Members of the 20th Parliament of Turkey
Members of the 42nd government of Turkey
Members of the 49th government of Turkey
Members of the 50th government of Turkey
Turkish Kurdish politicians
Ministers of State of Turkey
Kurdish politicians